Time and the Maiden is Claire Voyant's second album. All but one of the 10 original songs (Elysium) were remixed for Time Again, a collection of remixes.

Track listing
The original 1998 release contained tracks 1-10. When the album was re-released in 2000, 3 additional bonus tracks were added.

Release history

References

1998 albums
Claire Voyant (band) albums